The Rocky Ponds Creek, a watercourse that is part of the Murrumbidgee catchment within the Murray–Darling basin, is located in the South West Slopes region of New South Wales, Australia.

Course and features 
The creek descends  over its  course.

The Burley Griffin Way crosses the creek in the parish of Cumbamurra.

See also 

 List of rivers of New South Wales (L-Z)
 Rivers of New South Wales

References

External links

Murrumbidgee Catchment Management Authority website
 

Rivers of New South Wales
Tributaries of the Murrumbidgee River
Hilltops Council